The Salitre War (also Saltpeter War) was a 1480-1510 military conflict between the Tarascan state of Purépecha people and peoples settled in Colima, Sayula, Zapotlán, Tapalpa, and Autlán. It started with the invasion by Tarascan cazonci (monarch) Tangaxuan II with the purpose to seize the mining of saltpeter (hence the name) and ended with the expulsion of Purépecha from the areas of Colima and Jalisco.

References

History of Mesoamerica
Pre-Columbian warfare
1480s conflicts
1490s conflicts
1500s conflicts
Conflicts in 1510
Military history of Mexico
History of Jalisco
1480s in Mexico
1500s in Mexico
Purépecha